Karthik Gattamneni is an Indian cinematographer and director known for his works in Telugu cinema. He made his debut as a cinematographer with Prema Ishq Kaadhal in 2013, and has worked in several films since his debut. He is also one of the key founders of Pondfreaks Entertainment, a short film production house.

Early career
After graduating in Computer Science from Institute of Aeronautical Engineering, Karthik Ghattamneni aimed to become a director and tried to enter the Film and Television Institute of India Pune but couldn't make it. Then he decided to try cinematography and enrolled himself in Rajeev Menon's Mindscreen Institute for a year-long course. Later he directed a short film titled "Infinity" featuring Harshvardhan Rane which drew critical acclaim with celebrities like Farhan Akhtar appreciating Karthik's work. This appreciation resulted in him meeting Pavan Sadineni and both of them collaborated for Prema Ishq Kaadhal.

Filmography

As a cinematographer

As a director

As an editor

References

External links
 

Telugu film cinematographers
Living people
Cinematographers from Andhra Pradesh
1987 births
People from Anantapur, Andhra Pradesh

Telugu film directors
Indian film directors
21st-century Indian film directors